Baruunturuun Airport is an airport in Mongolia. The airport is located in Baruunturuun, capital of the province of Uvs. It has a grass runway 01/19 .

See also
List of airports in Mongolia

Airports in Mongolia